Selymbria, or Selybria (Σηλυβρία), or Selybrie (Σηλυβρίη), was a town of ancient Thrace on the Propontis, 22 Roman miles east from Perinthus, and 44 Roman miles west from Constantinople, near the southern end of the wall built by Anastasius I Dicorus for the protection of his capital.

History
According to Strabo, its name signifies "the town of Selys;" from which it has been inferred that Selys was the name of its founder, or of the leader of the colony from Megara, which founded it at an earlier period than the establishment of Byzantium, another colony of the same Greek city-state. In honour of Eudoxia, the wife of the emperor Arcadius, its name was changed to Eudoxiupolis or Eudoxioupolis (Εὐδοξιούπολις), which it bore for a considerable time; but the modern name of its site, Silivri, shows that it subsequently resumed its original designation.

Respecting the history of Selymbria, only detached and fragmentary notices occur in the Greek writers. In Latin authors, it is merely named; although Pliny the Elder reports that it was said to have been the birthplace of Prodicus, a disciple of Hippocrates. It was here that Xenophon met Medosades, the envoy of Seuthes II, whose forces afterwards encamped in its neighbourhood. When Alcibiades was commanding for the Athenians in the Propontis (410 BCE), the people of Selymbria refused to admit his army into the town, but gave him money, probably in order to induce him to abstain from forcing an entrance. Some time after this, however, he gained possession of the place through the treachery of some of the townspeople, and, having levied a contribution upon its inhabitants, left a garrison in it. Selymbria is mentioned by Demosthenes in 351 BCE, as in alliance with the Athenians; and it was no doubt at that time a member of the Byzantine confederacy. According to a letter of Philip II of Macedon, quoted in the oration de Corona, it was blockaded by him about 343 BCE; but others consider that this mention of Selymbria is one of the numerous proofs that the documents inserted in that speech are not authentic.

Polyidos (Πολύιδος) of Selymbria won with a dithyramb a contest at Athens.

Athenaeus in the Deipnosophistae wrote that Cleisophus (Κλείσοφος) of Selymbria fell in love with a statue of Parian marble while he was at Samos.

Works of Favorinus includes the "Letters of Selymbrians" (Σηλυμβρίων ἐπιστολαί).

Selymbria had a small, but significant mint, researched by Edith Schönert-Geiß.

In Christian times, Selymbria was the seat of an archbishop; no longer a residential see, it remains a titular see of the Roman Catholic Church.

Its site is located at Silivri in European Turkey.

References

Catholic titular sees in Europe
Megarian colonies in Thrace
Ancient Greek archaeological sites in Turkey
Populated places of the Byzantine Empire
Populated places in ancient Thrace
Former populated places in Turkey
History of Istanbul Province